Feneș may refer to several places in Romania:

 Feneș, a district in the town of Zlatna, Alba County
 Feneș, a village in Armeniș Commune, Caraș-Severin County
 Feneș (Ampoi), a tributary of the Ampoi in Alba County
 Feneș (Feernic), a tributary of the Feernic in Harghita County
 Feneș (Someș), a tributary of the Someșul Mic in Cluj County
 Feneș (Timiș), a tributary of the Timiș in Caraș-Severin County

See also
Fenes, Nordland, a village in Bodø, Norway